NFL GameDay 99 is a football video game for the PlayStation and Microsoft Windows. It was first released in 1998 by 989 Sports. On the cover is Terrell Davis.

Reception

The PlayStation version received "favorable" reviews, while the PC version received "average" reviews, according to the review aggregation website GameRankings. Next Generation said of the former console version, "There is really no room for criticism of NFL GameDay '99 – it provides everything a gamer could possibly want from a console football game."

References

External links
 

1998 video games
NFL GameDay video games
North America-exclusive video games
PlayStation (console) games
Video games developed in the United States
Video games set in 1999
Windows games